This is a list of documentary films about China. Some included works may be alternatively classified as television documentaries or television series episodes.

Ascension (2021)
Behind the Strings (2020), the westward journeys of Shanghai Quartet's members out of the Cultural Revolution
 BBC Reggie in China (2020)
Guangzhou Dream Factory (2016)
 The Chinese Mayor (2015)
China Remix - African Hip-Hop Artists in China (2015)
 BBC Secrets of China (2015)
China Rising, Latest World News (Al Jazeera), 4 episodes
Diaoyu Islands - The Truth (2014 Film) (2014)
Human Harvest (2014)
TIBET - The Truth (2013)
Living with Dead Hearts (2013)
Ai Weiwei: Never Sorry (2012)
Restoring the Light (2011)
Dreamwork China (2011)
China's Century of Humiliation - Documentary Film (2011)
The Warriors of Qiugang (2011)
China Wow! (2010-?)
The Ditch (2010)
China: The Rebirth of an Empire (2010)
Beijing Taxi (2010) 
Transmission 6-10 (2009)
Last Train Home (2009)
People's Republic of Capitalism (2009)
China's Unnatural Disaster: The Tears of Sichuan Province (2009)
Tongzhi in Love (2008)
Dynamic China (2007)
Up the Yangtze (2007)
Mao’s Bloody Revolution Revealed / Mao, une histoire chinoise (2007)
The Blood of Yingzhou District (2006)
China from the Inside (2006)
Discovery Atlas: China Revealed (2006)
Tibet: Murder in the Snow (2006)
Declassified: Chairman Mao (2006)
Declassified: Tiananmen Square (2006)
The Tank Man (2006)
Mardi Gras: Made in China (2005)
China Blue (2005)
Seoul Train (2005)
China's Lost Girls (2004)
From China with Love (2004)
China in the Red (2003)
Morning Sun (2003)
China 21 (2001)
American Experience: Nixon's China Game (2000)
Citizen Hong Kong (1999)
Comrades (1999)
Sunrise Over Tiananmen Square (1998)
China: A Century of Revolution – Part Three: Born Under the Red Flag 1976-1997 (1997)
The Gate of Heavenly Peace (1995)
Moving the Mountain (1995)
The Dying Rooms (1995)
Chinese Roots (1994)
China: A Century of Revolution – Part Two: The Mao Years 1949-1976 (1994)
Timewatch Chairman Mao: The Last Emperor (1993)
China: A Century of Revolution – Part One: China in Revolution 1911-1949 (1989)
China Diary (1989)
River Elegy
China Rises
Mao Tse Tung: China's Peasant Emperor
Chung Kuo, Cina, an Italian documentary directed by Michelangelo Antonioni (1972)
Report From China (3 part series, 90 minutes total runtime) Originally titled "Country of Dawn" (1966/1967)
China: The Roots of Madness (1967)

References

External links
worldcat.org - worldwide library search engine, can be used to locate above titles for inter-library exchange
China Documentaries - a collection of links to documentary films and media reports about the People's Republic of China
China Documentaries - a collection of links to documentary films and media reports about the People's Republic of China
 - a collection of films about the People's Republic of China. Also listed on IMDB.

China
China
 
Chinese documentary films
Chinese film-related lists